Alam Dad Lalika (born 12 March 1987) is a Pakistani politician who has been a member of the National Assembly of Pakistan, since August 2018. Previously he was a member of the National Assembly from June 2013 to May 2018.

Early life
He was born on 12 March 1987.Grew up in Lahore, at a young age he enjoyed cars and was keen on them. Having to deal with his fathers death especially at a very young age and taking on the responsabilities that came with it was a big challenge.

Political career

He was elected to the National Assembly of Pakistan as a candidate of Pakistan Muslim League (N) (PML-N) from Constituency NA-189 (Bahawalnagar-II) in 2013 Pakistani general election. He received 95,060 votes and defeated Mian Mumtaz Ahmad Matyana, a candidate of Pakistan Tehreek-e-Insaf (PTI). During his tenure as Member of the National Assembly, he served as Federal Parliamentary Secretary for Communications.

In April 2018, reportedly he quit PML-N but this report turned out to be fake. However he rejected the claims.

He was re-elected to the National Assembly as a candidate of PML-N from Constituency NA-167 (Bahawalnagar-II) in 2018 Pakistani general election.

References

Living people
Pakistan Muslim League (N) politicians
Punjabi people
Pakistani MNAs 2013–2018
Place of birth missing (living people)
1987 births
Pakistani MNAs 2018–2023